The Association of Veterans of the Revolution (Spanish: Asociacion de los Veteranos de la Revolución) is an association for the former soldiers and servicemen during the establishment of the Philippine Revolutionary Army whom participated during the Philippine Revolution and the Philippine-America War.

Organized by former President Emilio Aguinaldo in 1912. The Association secured pensions for its members and made arrangements for them to buy land on installment from the present government. Baldomero Aguinaldo was named president of the organization during its inception, and served in this capacity until his death of February 4, 1915. Among those who received land from the government were Manuel Tinio, Pio Valenzuela, and Mariano Trias. Another project was the Mausoleum of the Veterans of the Revolution a mausoleum constructed in Manila North Cemetery, designed by an Architect Arcadio de Guzmán Arellano inaugurated on May 30, 1920. General Mariano Noriel, Tomas Arguelles and Pio del Pilar are some of the few who were interred inside the structure.

References

Veterans' organizations
Clubs and societies in the Philippines
1912 establishments
Emilio Aguinaldo